Piotr Plewnia (born 29 May 1977 in Opole) is a Polish football manager and former player.

Career

Coaching career
Retiring at the end of 2012, he returned to his former club GKS Katowice, as a youth coach for the player from 1996. On 19 December 2013, he was then appointed assistant coach of Odra Opole. In 2015, Plewnia was also coaching the club's U19 team alongside Tomasz Copik. On 5 May 2018, he was appointed interim head coach following the release of Mirosław Smyła. Plewnia was in charge for two games, losing the first and winning the last, before Mariusz Rumak was hired as new head coach and therefore, Plewnia continued in his role as assistant coach. 

On 24 August 2019, Plewnia was appointed head coach once again after Rumak was fired. This time, Plewnia was in charge for the rest of 2019. Out of 16 games, he won 6, lost 7 and drew 3 before Dietmar Brehmer was hired as new head coach from January 2020, with Plewnia continuing at the club in his role as an assistant coach.

References

External links 
 Piotr Plewnia profile - 90minut.pl

1977 births
Living people
Polish footballers
GKS Katowice players
Polonia Warsaw players
Odra Opole players
Widzew Łódź players
Polonia Bytom players
Ekstraklasa players
I liga players
II liga players
III liga players
Polish football managers
Odra Opole managers
I liga managers
Association football midfielders
Sportspeople from Opole